KSHI (90.9 FM) is a radio station licensed to serve Zuni, New Mexico.  The station is owned by Zuni Communications Authority.  It airs a Variety radio format.

The station was assigned the KSHI call letters by the Federal Communications Commission. The pronunciation of the call letters is the same as the Zuni word for "hello."

References

External links
John Beahm at Zuni Radio (June 1978)
Zuni/English word list

SHI